The following events occurred in July 1953:

July 1, 1953 (Wednesday)
 Howard Hawks's musical film Gentlemen Prefer Blondes, starring Marilyn Monroe and Jane Russell, is released by 20th Century Fox.

July 2, 1953 (Thursday)
In the UK, the Birmingham Edgbaston by-election, brought about by the elevation of  Conservative MP, Peter Bennett to the peerage, the seat is retained for the Conservatives by Edith Pitt.

July 3, 1953 (Friday)
 The first ascent of Nanga Parbat in the Pakistan Himalayas, the world's ninth highest mountain, is made by Austrian climber Hermann Buhl alone on a German–Austrian expedition.

July 4, 1953 (Saturday)
 On the final day of the Wimbledon Tennis Championships in London, UK, Vic Seixas of the United States defeats Danish player Kurt Nielsen to win the Men's singles competition.

July 5, 1953 (Sunday)
 The Vasil Levski National Stadium opens in Sofia, Bulgaria.

July 6, 1953 (Monday)
Born: Nanci Griffith, American singer-songwriter, in Seguin, Texas (died 2021)

July 7, 1953 (Tuesday)
1953 Menzengraben mining accident: Three people are killed as a result of an explosion in a potash mine in Menzengraben, East Germany.
Walter Burkemo wins the 1953 PGA Championship golf tournament in Birmingham, Alabama, United States.
Died: Harry Eyre, novice speedway rider, of injuries sustained in a crash at West Ham Stadium during the 1953 Speedway National League season.

July 8, 1953 (Wednesday)
 US local TV channel Nevada TV, KLAS-TV, broadcasts for the first time on channel 8 at 7pm.

July 9, 1953 (Thursday)
 The US Treasury formally renames the Bureau of Internal Revenue; the new name (which had previously been used informally) is the Internal Revenue Service.
 Arsonist Stanford Pattan starts the Rattlesnake Fire in the Mendocino National Forest in northern California. The fire kills one United States Forest Service employee and 14 volunteer firefighters before being controlled on July 11.
Died: Annie Kenney, 73, British working-class suffragette

July 10, 1953 (Friday)
 The Soviet official newspaper Pravda announces that Lavrentiy Beria has been deposed as head of the MVD.

July 11, 1953 (Saturday)
A solar eclipse is visible.

July 12, 1953 (Sunday)
Voting begins in the Lebanese general election, continuing until August 9.
Died: Herbert Rawlinson, English actor (b. 1885)

July 13, 1953 (Monday)
India introduces the Modified Scheme of Elementary education 1953 in Madras State. The scheme, promoted by C. Rajagopalachari (Rajaji), will be dropped by his successor the following year.

July 14, 1953 (Tuesday)
14 July 1953 demonstration: In Paris, France, police open fire on protesters from the Algerian anti-colonial Movement for the Triumph of Democratic Liberties, resulting in seven deaths.

July 15, 1953 (Wednesday)
The Welfare Ordinance 1953 is passed in Australia's Northern Territory, under which the Director of Native Affairs is replaced by a Director of Welfare, who exerts control over the lives of Aboriginal people.
 China First Automobile Work, present-day FAW Group, a truck, bus and automobile product and sales company in China, is founded in Changchun.

July 16, 1953 (Thursday)
In Italy, the De Gasperi VIII Cabinet begins its 32-day period in office, one of the shortest in the country's political history.
Norway's Parliament votes to move the country's main naval base from Horten to a new base in Bergen.
Second Battle of Dongshan Island: Three landing ships belonging to the Republic of China's navy are sunk in a harbour on the coast of Dongshan Island by mortar fire, which detonated their cargoes of ammunition.
Died: Hilaire Belloc, 82, French-born British writer and historian

July 17, 1953 (Friday)
 USMC R4Q NROTC crash: the greatest recorded loss of United States midshipmen in a single event results from an aircraft crash near NAS Whiting Field, killing 43 including 38 midshipmen.
The second Miss Universe pageant is held in Long Beach, California, United States, and is won by the French contestant, Christiane Martel. 
Died: Maude Adams, 80, American actress

July 18, 1953 (Saturday)

July 19, 1953 (Sunday)
In the final of the Ulster Senior Gaelic Football Championship, Armagh defeat Cavan at Casement Park, Belfast, to go through to the 1953 All-Ireland Senior Football Championship semi-final.
Born: Shōichi Nakagawa, Japanese politician, in Tokyo (died 2009)

July 20, 1953 (Monday)
Died: Dumarsais Estimé, 53, President of Haiti, at Columbia Presbyterian Hospital in New York City

July 21, 1953 (Tuesday)
The 1953 World Archery Championships open in Oslo, Norway, running until July 25.
Born: Jeff Fatt, Australian musician and actor, co-founder of The Wiggles, in Casino, New South Wales

July 22, 1953 (Wednesday)
Born: Paul Quarrington, Canadian novelist, playwright, screenwriter, filmmaker, musician and teacher, in Toronto (died 2010)

July 23, 1953 (Thursday)
The US tanker vessel Pan Georgia explodes and is burnt out at Wilmington, Delaware. It would later be converted for use as a dredger.

July 24, 1953 (Friday)
Born: Tadashi Kawamata, Japanese artist, in Mikasa, Hokkaido

July 25, 1953 (Saturday)
The 1953 World Archery Championships conclude in Oslo, Norway. Sweden wins the men's team event and Finland the women's.

July 26, 1953 (Sunday)
 Fidel Castro and his brother lead a disastrous assault on the Moncada Barracks, preliminary to the Cuban Revolution.
 The 1953 Tour de France is won by Louison Bobet.
 The Esposizione internazionale dell'agricoltura di Roma opens in Rome, Italy, running until October 31.
 The 1953 Pan Arab Games open in Alexandria, Egypt, running until 10 August.
 The Short Creek raid is carried out on a polygynous Mormon sect in Arizona, United States. It is thought to have been "the largest mass arrest of men and women in modern American history."
The Spanish ship Duero collides with the British ship Culrain in the Strait of Gibraltar and sinks. All 28 crew members are saved.
In the Munster final of the 1953 All-Ireland Senior Hurling Championship, Cork GAA defeat Tipperary GAA, with the highest points total (21) scored in a match during the competition.
A total lunar eclipse is visible from Australia, East Asia, and North and South America.

July 27, 1953 (Monday)
 The Korean War ends with the Korean Armistice Agreement: United Nations Command (Korea) (United States), People's Republic of China, North Korea sign an armistice agreement at Panmunjom and the north remains communist while the south remains capitalist.

July 28, 1953 (Tuesday)

July 29, 1953 (Wednesday)
Died: Richard William Pearse, 75, New Zealand aviation pioneer

July 30, 1953 (Thursday)
Preliminary studies were completed by C. E. Brown, W. J. O'Sullivan, Jr., and C. H. Zimmerman at the Langley Aeronautical Laboratory relative to the study of the problems of human spaceflight and a suggested test vehicle to investigate these problems. It was believed that such a vehicle could not only resolve some of the aerodynamic heating problems, but also that the altitude objective would provide an environment with a minimum atmospheric density, representing many problems of outer space flight. However, there was already a feeling among many NACA scientists that the speed and altitude exploratory area should be raised. In fact, a resolution to this effect, presented as early as July 1952, stated that ". . . the NACA devote . . . effort to problems of unmanned and manned flights at altitudes from 50 miles to infinity and at speeds from mach 10 to the velocity of escape from the earth's gravity." The Executive Committee of NACA actually adopted this resolution as an objective on July 14, 1952.

July 31, 1953 (Friday)
Died: Robert A. Taft, 63, American politician, United States Senate Majority Leader, of pancreatic cancer

References

1953
1953-07
1953-07